Bhaggolokkhi is an Indian Bengali language television series produced under the banner of Shashi Mittal and Sumeet Hukamchand Mittal of Shashi Sumeet Productions. It aired from 31 August 2020 to 21 March 2021 on Star Jalsha. It is a remake of Star Vijay's Tamil series Pandian Stores. The series starred Rahul Majumder and Sharly Modak.

Plot
Bodhayon Sarkar is the head of the family who runs a garment shop named Lakshmi Stores. He has two younger brothers, Rupayan and Subhayan. These three brothers and their paralysed mother Lakshmi lead a happy life. However, the stores which is running in loss and in debt is summoned by the court to seal it. While Bodhayon's marriage gets fixed with Rohini, on his marriage day he realises that Rohini loves his wealth only and considering Bhagyasree as the right person seeing her as an honest and responsible person, Bodhayon marries Bhagyasree which shocks Lakshmi who dislikes Bhagyasree. Because of this, Rohini wishes to revenge Bodhayon's family while Bhagyasree helps Bodhayon to recover their business in debt and also taking care of the family, striving for her acceptance by her mother-in-law who dislikes her. She takes care of everyone in the family and always be for them. Later, Bodhayon's brothers Subhayan and Rupayan marry Riya and Rusha.

Bhagyasree wishes to pursue an MBA on Bodhayon's insistence, but Lakshmi initially disapproves. The drama follows how Bhagyasree saves and maintains the unity of the Sarkar family from various threats from the Basak and Gupta families. Rohini realises and apologises for her mistakes and helps Bhagya expose Himadri and arrest him. The series ends with Bhagyasree being enrolled in an MBA college by Lakshmi and the family uniting and living happily after.

Cast

Main
Sharly Modak as Bhagyasree Sarkar aka Bhagya, Bodhi's wife, Riya and Rohini's cousin. 
Rahul Majumdar as Bodhayon Sarkar aka Bodhi

Recurring
Farhan Imroze as Rupayon "Roop" Sarkar
Prarabdhi Singha as Subhayan "Subho" Sarkar
Moyna Mukherjee as Lakshmi Sarkar: Bodhi, Roop and Subho's mother
Surabhi Mallick as Rusha Gupta: Roop's wife, Himadri's daughter
Ashmita Chakraborty as Riya Basak: Subho's wife, Bhagya's youngest cousin, Rohini's youngest sister
Arpita Mukherjee as Hoimonti Basak: Riya and Rohini's mother
Avrajit Chakraborty as Biswanath Basak
Debdoot Ghosh as Himadri Gupta: Rusha's father who is the main enemy of Sarkar family
Swagata Sen as Rohini Basak: Hoimonti's daughter, Riya's elder sister, Bhagya's cousin
Argha Mitra as Neel
Yuvraaj Chowdhury as Avik/Deb

Reception
In week 42 of 2020, the series has risen to fifth place with 4.557 million impressions for the most watched television series in Bengal.

References

Star Jalsha original programming
Indian drama television series
2020 Indian television series debuts
2021 Indian television series endings
Bengali-language television programming in India
Bengali-language television series based on Tamil-language television series